Fruitvale Road railway station is on the Western Line of the Auckland railway network. It is near local schools, including two major high schools.

The station was opened on 28 September 1953.

In 2006–2007, the station was closed over summer to be upgraded, and lengthened for 6-car trains.

The station is known as the final confirmed place of missing French teenager Eloi Rolland, who went missing from Piha on 7 March 2020.

Station name
It is named after a nearby road. The road is not very well known, thus new passengers will most likely have no idea which suburb this station serves. It has been proposed to rename it 'Kelston' since it is in that suburb. It is quite close to Kelston Shopping Centre, Kelston Girls' College and Kelston Deaf Education Centre.

See also 
 List of Auckland railway stations

References 

Rail transport in Auckland
Railway stations in New Zealand
Railway stations opened in 1953
Whau Local Board Area
Buildings and structures in Auckland
West Auckland, New Zealand